Jaray is a surname. Notable people with the surname include:

 Hans Jaray (1906−1990), Austrian actor, director, and author
 Paul Jaray (1889−1974), Hungarian engineer, designer, and pioneer of automotive streamlining
 Tess Jaray (born 1937), British painter and printmaker

See also
 Jara (surname)